Melanoplus borealis, known generally as the northern spur-throat grasshopper or northern grasshopper, is a species of spur-throated grasshopper in the family Acrididae. It is found in North America.

Subspecies
These four subspecies belong to the species Melanoplus borealis:
 Melanoplus borealis borealis (Fieber, 1853) i
 Melanoplus borealis palaceus Fulton, 1930 i
 Melanoplus borealis stupefactus (Scudder, 1876) i
 Melanoplus borealis utahensis Scudder, 1897 i
Data sources: i = ITIS, c = Catalogue of Life, g = GBIF, b = Bugguide.net

References

Melanoplinae
Articles created by Qbugbot
Insects described in 1853